Carrick Primary School may refer to:

Carrick Primary School (Warrenpoint), Warrenpoint, County Down, Northern Ireland
Carrick Primary School (Lurgan), Lurgan, County Armagh, Northern Ireland